The Defense Human Resources Activity (DHRA) is a United States Department of Defense (DoD) Field Activity chartered to support the Under Secretary of Defense for Personnel and Readiness (USD(P&R)). The scope of DHRA's mission is very broad, giving the USD flexibility to explore and field new technologies and programs that benefit warfighters, their family members, as well as DoD civilians. DHRA programs impact the delivery of benefits, readiness, force protection, and the detection and elimination of fraud. DHRA provides support and services that improve the efficiency, productivity, and quality of life throughout the Department.

Leading the way for a number of key DoD Components and programs, DHRA is the trusted source for:

 General management and direction on a wide variety of human resource matters
 Budgetary support and management
 Guidance on civilian personnel policy, professional development programs, and personnel security
 Program support in the benefits, readiness, and force protection areas
 Management, research, and analysis of manpower data
 Guidance on overall effectiveness, efficiency, and productivity of personnel operations
 Guidance and information on Common Access Card (CAC) issuance and procedures
 Strategic direction of requirements related to language and regional expertise
 Oversight of the capability of the DoD to respond to the needs of victims of sexual assault
 Operation, consolidation, and management of commercial travel for the DoD

External links

http://www.dhra.mil
http://www.cac.mil

Human Resources Activity